Kevin Anderson may refer to:

Arts and entertainment
 Kevin Anderson (actor) (born 1960), American actor
 Kevin J. Anderson (born 1962), American science fiction author
 Kevin Anderson (tenor) (fl. 1990s), American opera singer
 Kevin Anderson (cinematographer), Australian cinematographer and filmmaker
 Kevin T. Anderson, American musician

Sports
 Kevin Anderson (athletic director) (born 1955), American university sports administrator
 Kevin Anderson (soccer) (born 1971), American soccer midfielder
 Kevin Anderson (boxer) (born 1983), British boxer
 Kevin Anderson (tennis) (born 1986), South African tennis player
 Kevin Anderson (basketball) (born 1988), American basketball player
 Kevin Anderson (American football) (born 1994), American football player

Others
 Kevin Victor Anderson (1912–1999), Australian jurist
 Kevin B. Anderson (born 1948), American sociologist
 Kevin Anderson (scientist) (born 1962), British climate scientist
 Kevin Anderson (train conductor) (died 2018), fatally wounded during the Ponton train derailment
 Kevin Anderson (politician), Australian politician